was a Japanese football player. He played for Japan national team.

Club career
Watanabe was born in Hiroshima on September 24, 1924. After graduating from Kokugakuin University, he played for Chugoku Electric Power.

National team career
In March 1954, Watanabe was selected Japan national team for 1954 World Cup qualification. At this qualification, on March 14, he debuted against South Korea. He also played at 1954 Asian Games. He played 2 games for Japan in 1954.

On October 12, 2011, Watanabe died of pancreatic cancer in Hiroshima at the age of 87.

National team statistics

References

External links
 
 Japan National Football Team Database

1924 births
2011 deaths
Kokugakuin University alumni
Association football people from Hiroshima Prefecture
Japanese footballers
Japan international footballers
Footballers at the 1954 Asian Games
Association football goalkeepers
Asian Games competitors for Japan